The Syr Darya sturgeon (Pseudoscaphirhynchus fedtschenkoi) is a species of fish in the family Acipenseridae. It is found in Kazakhstan, Tajikistan and Uzbekistan, where it is endemic to the Syr Darya River and, before its drainage, the Aral Sea. Due to the loss of its breeding site and damming projects over the length of the river, it is currently considered Critically Endangered and likely extinct, as no sightings have been reported since the 1960s. The sturgeon is among the 25 "most wanted lost" species that are the focus of Global Wildlife Conservation's "Search for Lost Species" initiative.

References

Pseudoscaphirhynchus
Freshwater fish of Asia
Fish of Central Asia
Fauna of Tajikistan
Critically endangered fish
Critically endangered fauna of Asia
Fish described in 1872
Taxonomy articles created by Polbot